The 1992 African Cup of Champions Clubs was the 28th edition of the annual international club football competition held in the CAF region (Africa), the African Cup of Champions Clubs. It determined that year's club champion of association football in Africa.

Wydad AC from Morocco won that final, and became for the first time CAF club champion.

Preliminary round

|}
1 CD Elá Nguema withdrew after 1st leg.

First round

|}

Second round

|}
1 AS Sotema withdrew.

Quarter-finals

|}

Semi-finals

|}

Final

Wydad Casablanca won 2–0 on aggregate.

Champion

Top scorers
The top scorers from the 1992 African Cup of Champions Clubs are as follows:

References
Champions' Cup 1992 - rsssf.com

1
African Cup of Champions Clubs